Still on the Road is a 1994 album by Rosemary Clooney. Like her 1992 album Girl Singer, Still on the Road features Clooney singing with a big band directed by her pianist John Oddo.

Track listing
 "On the Road Again" (Willie Nelson) – 3:35
 "Rules of the Road" (Cy Coleman, Carolyn Leigh) – 4:25
 "Corcovado (Quiet Nights of Quiet Stars)" (Antonio Carlos Jobim, Gene Lees) – 3:06
 "How Are Things in Glocca Morra?" (Yip Harburg, Burton Lane) – 5:00
 "Let's Get Away from It All" (Tom Adair, Matt Dennis) – 4:07
 "Moonlight Mississippi (A Whistle Stop Town)" (Willard Robison) – 3:24
 "(Back Home Again In) Indiana" (James F. Hanley, Ballard MacDonald) – 2:02
 "Ol' Man River" (Oscar Hammerstein II, Jerome Kern) – 1:56
 "Take Me Back to Manhattan" (Cole Porter) – 5:09
 "How Deep Is the Ocean?" (Irving Berlin) – 4:11
 "Road to Morocco" - with Jack Sheldon (Johnny Burke, Jimmy Van Heusen) – 2:31
 "Still on the Road" (Earl Brown, Bill Mumy) – 4:34
 "Till We Meet Again" - with Earl Brown (Raymond B. Egan, Richard A. Whiting) – 3:04
 "Let's Eat Home" (Dave Frishberg) – 2:59
 "Still Crazy After All These Years" (Paul Simon) – 4:03

Personnel

Performance
 Rosemary Clooney – vocals
 Daniel Greco – percussion
 Larry McGuire – trumpet, flugelhorn
 John Oddo – piano
 Joe Porcaro – percussion
 Chuck Berghofer – bass guitar
 Warren Luening – trumpet, flugelhorn
 Tommy Newson – tenor saxophone, flute, clarinet
 Tim May – guitar
 Charles Loper – trombone
 Larry Hall – trumpet, flugelhorn
 Gary Foster – alto saxophone, flute, clarinet
 Jeff Hamilton – drums 
 Don Ashworth – baritone saxophone, flute, clarinet, oboe
 Joe Soldo – alto saxophone, flute, clarinet
 Dan Higgins – tenor saxophone, flute, clarinet
 Phil Teele – trombone
 Rick Baptist – trumpet, flugelhorn

References 

1994 albums
Rosemary Clooney albums
Concord Records albums